Team Ireland Roller Derby represents Ireland in women's international roller derby, in events such as the Roller Derby World Cup.  Affectionately known as the "Green Machine", the team was first formed to compete at the 2011 Roller Derby World Cup, and finished the tournament in tenth place. 

The Irish team warmed up for the 2011 World Cup with a number of bouts against English leagues, starting with the Sheffield Steel Rollergirls.

At the World Cup, Ireland lost to Team Finland in round 1; then easily beat Roller Derby Brasil in the consolation stage, but lost to Roller Derby Germany to finish tenth.

The team's head coach, Violent Bob, from Dublin Roller Girls, stated afterwards that the team were "probably among the underdogs" at the World Cup, but were "pretty proud of how we got on".  He highlighted in particular the team's group stage 64–119 loss to Team England as a competitive performance.

Team roster

2016 - 2018 Training Squad
Team Ireland named its team training squad of 30 skaters in November 2016, following try-outs. Head Coach is Karl Case (Lt Damn) from Manchester Roller Derby and Team Ireland Men's Roller Derby, and assistant coach is Jeff Roche from Limerick Roller Derby and Team Ireland Men's Roller Derby Team Manager is Mary Bowe (Bowe T-Vicious) from Waterford City Viqueens.

2014 team roster
Team Ireland named its roster for the 2014 Blood & Thunder Roller Derby World Cup in October 2014. Team Coach is Sinister Mary Clarence (London Rollergirls, Assistant Coach is Kitty Cadaver (Dublin Roller Derby) and Line up manager is Belle Igerent (Limerick Rollergirls). The team manager is Titstanium (Limerick Rollergirls).

2011 team roster

Team Ireland named its initial roster in September 2011, following try-outs. Most of the skaters were from Ireland's two leagues with bouting experience, the Dublin Roller Girls and Cork City Firebirds.  
(league affiliations listed as of at the time of the announcement)

Notes

References

Ireland
Roller derby
Roller derby in Ireland
2011 establishments in Ireland
Sports clubs established in 2011